McDowell's Cup was an Indian association football tournament held in Kolkata and organized by Indian Football Association (IFA). The tournament was first started in 1995 and was instituted as the Calcutta football season opener. It was sponsored by McDowell's No.1 Vijay Mallya's United Breweries Group. Apart from some top clubs from West Bengal, clubs from other Indian states and clubs from Bangladesh also participated in the tournament.

McDowell Cup 6th and last edition held in 2000 was won by East Bengal FC defeating rivals Mohun Bagan in the final.

Results

References 

Football cup competitions in India
Football competitions in Kolkata
1995 establishments in India
2000 disestablishments in India
Defunct football competitions in India